The ARIA Singles Chart ranks the best-performing singles in Australia. Its data, published by the Australian Recording Industry Association, is based collectively on the weekly physical and digital sales of singles. In 2016, fifteen singles claimed the top spot, including Justin Bieber's "Love Yourself", which started its peak position in 2015, and seventeen acts achieved their first number-one single in Australia: Jonas Blue, Dakota, Zayn, Flume, Kai, Lukas Graham, Gnash, Olivia O'Brien, Drake, Wizkid, Kyla, The Chainsmokers, Halsey, James Arthur, Clean Bandit, Sean Paul and Anne-Marie.

Chart history

Number-one artists

See also
2016 in music
List of number-one albums of 2016 (Australia)
List of top 25 singles for 2016 in Australia
List of top 10 singles in 2016 (Australia)

References

Australia singles
Number-one singles
2016